The 1993–94 Irish Cup was the 114th edition of Northern Ireland's premier football knock-out cup competition. It concluded on 7 May 1994 with the final.

Bangor were the defending champions after winning their 1st Irish Cup last season, with a 1–0 win over Ards in the 1993 final second replay after the first two games ended as 1–1 draws. This season they reached the final again (to date, their last final appearance), but lost 2–0 to Linfield who won the cup for the 34th time, 12 years after their last Irish Cup win in 1982.

Results

First round
The following teams were given byes into the second round: Ballymacash Rangers, Bessbrook United, Connor, Donard Hospital, Downshire Young Men, Glebe Rangers, Harland & Wolff Sports, Magherafelt Sky Blues, Orangefield Old Boys, Portstewart, Roe Valley and UUJ.

|}

Replays

|}

Second round
The following teams were given byes into the third round: AFC and Oxford United Stars.

|}

Replays

|}

Third round

|}

Fourth round

|}

Replays

|}

Fifth round

|}

Replays

|}

Sixth round

|}

Replay

|}

Quarter-finals

|}

Replay

|}

Semi-finals

|}

Final

References

1993–94
1993–94 domestic association football cups
Cup